Subrata Adak is an Indian biochemist and a senior scientist at the Indian Institute of Chemical Biology. An alumnus of Jadavpur University from where he secured a PhD, Adak is known for his studies on Leishmania, the causative pathogen of Leishmaniasis. His studies have been documented by way of a number of articles and ResearchGate, an online repository of scientific articles has listed 55 of them. Besides, he has published one monograph on Leishmania where he has also contributed chapters. The Department of Biotechnology of the Government of India awarded him the National Bioscience Award for Career Development, one of the highest Indian science awards, for his contributions to biosciences, in 2012.

Selected bibliography

Books

Articles

Notes

References

External links 
 
 Subrata Adak Google Scholar Profile

N-BIOS Prize recipients
Indian scientific authors
Living people
Indian medical researchers
Year of birth missing (living people)
Scientists from West Bengal
Jadavpur University alumni
Indian biochemists